Xivray-et-Marvoisin is a commune in the Meuse department in Grand Est in north-eastern France.

Geography
The Rupt de Mad forms part of the commune's southern border, then flows northeastward through its eastern part.

Population

See also
Communes of the Meuse department
Parc naturel régional de Lorraine

References

Xivrayetmarvoisin